A drain cleaner is a method of unblocking sewer pipes or clogged wastewater drains. The term may also refer to a mechanical device such as a plumber's snake, drain auger, toilet plunger, or similar device. Occasionally, the term is applied to a plumber or other individual who performs the drain cleaning and hygiene.  Chemical drain cleaners can also be used.

 Chemical drain cleaners, plungers, handheld drain augers, and air burst drain cleaners are typically applied to the problem of a clogged single drain, such as a sink, toilet, tub, or shower drain. An effective drain cleaner can remove soft obstructions (such as hair and grease) accumulating near the fixture's drain inlet.
If more than one plumbing fixture is clogged then electric drain cleaners, battery powered drain cleaners, sewer jetters or such mechanical devices are usually required to  clear obstructions along the entire length of the drain piping system, that is, from fixture drain inlets through the main building drains and lateral piping outside the building to the collector sewer mains.

History 
The history of drain cleaners parallels the development of common drain systems themselves.  As a result, there is not an extensive history of cleaners in the US, as municipal plumbing systems were not readily available in middle-class American homes until the early 20th century. Prior to this time, Americans often discarded the dirty water collected in basins after use. Limited piping systems gradually developed with lead materials, but after WWI when the poisonous properties of lead became more well-known, piping was reconstructed with galvanized iron.

Galvanized iron is actually steel covered in a protective layer of zinc, but it was soon discovered that this zinc layer naturally corroded due to exposure to the atmosphere and rainwater, as well as cement, runoff, etc. Once corrosion occurred down to the base metal, porous plaques and rust would form, leading to sediment build-up that would gradually clog these drains.

The problems with corroding galvanized iron pipes eventually led to their replacement by copper or plastic (PVC) piping by the 1960s. Natural substances such as hair, grease, or other oils continued to be an issue in drain clogs, encouraging the development of chemical drain cleaners as well as mechanical tools to clear drains.

Handheld drain augers

Handheld drain augers are typically designed to clean portions of a drain within  of the drain opening. The springy, flexible cable of a handheld drain auger is pushed into a drain while the operator rotates a drum that anchors the cable. Similar to handheld augers, drain rods can be used for clearing blockages in long, straight runs of pipe.

Many handheld augers have cables which are thin enough to pass through common sink traps, but manufacturers do not recommend using handheld drain augers in toilets because of their potential to scratch ceramic surfaces. Instead, a special closet auger (from "water closet") should be used.

Advantages of handheld drain augers include low relative cost and ready availability of these tools in hardware stores. They are also only effective on small-diameter pipes rather than main sewer pipes.

Safety considerations include protective gloves and eye protection, and practicing good hygiene after coming into contact with drain fluids.

Air burst drain cleaners

Air burst drain cleaners use accelerated carbon dioxide, air or other gas to rupture the clog membrane. Accelerated gas creates a force on standing water that can dislodge clogs that accumulate close to drain openings.

Advantages of air burst drain cleaners include the potential to immediately clear clogs and slow-running drains, in contrast to chemical cleaners that can take more time to work. Air burst cleaners can dislodge obstructions that are further away from drain openings than can a plunger, and in contrast to drain augers do not risk scratching the ceramic surfaces of sinks, bathtubs and toilets.

Disadvantages of air burst drain cleaners include a limited cleaning range in pipes that do not contain standing water and, in general, ineffectiveness for unclogging blocked main sewer drains.

Safety considerations for air burst drain cleaners include a requirement to wear eye protection and, when using an air burst cleaner that uses compressed gas cartridges, careful handling of unused cartridges.

Hydro-mechanical drain cleaners
Hydro-mechanical drain cleans use high-pressure water to break up obstructions and flush these smaller particles down the drain.

Most municipal building codes mandate that drain plumbing increase in diameter as it moves closer to the municipal sewer system.  i.e., most kitchen sinks evacuate water with a -inch drain pipe, which feeds into a larger 4-inch drain pipe on the main plumbing stack before heading to a septic tank or to the city sewage system.  This means that, barring intrusion by tree roots or other debris into buried piping, the vast majority of household drain clogs occur in the smallest-diameter piping, usually in the pop-up or drain trap, where they can be reached easily by a hydro-mechanical device's water hose.

Advantages of hydro-mechanical drain cleaners are their eco-friendliness (most use only tap water), their ability to dislodge and remove clogs like sand or cat litter that 'back-fill when using a conventional snake, and their friendliness to plumbing joints.  Unlike air-burst cleaners, hydro-mechanical drain cleaners do not pressurize plumbing joints.  On some models of hydro-mechanical drain cleaner both hot and cold water can be used, providing added cleaning power for fat, protein, or other easily melting drain clogs.

Disadvantages of hydro-mechanical drain cleaners included limited reach into drain plumbing, and the necessity of a water source to act as the motive agent.

Safety considerations for hydro-mechanical drain cleaners include the risk of injury from high-pressure water coming into contact with skin or delicate areas of the body (i.e., eyes, and face).

Electric drain cleaners 

Electric drain cleaners, also called plumber's snakes, use the mechanical force of an electric motor to twist a flexible cable or spring in a clockwise direction and drive it into a pipe.

Advantages of electric drain cleaners include the ability to clean long sections of sewer drain, the ability to remove solid objects such as tree roots and jewelry, and ready availability through hardware stores and tool rental counters. Machines using springs can easily negotiate multiple 90-degree bends while maintaining their effectiveness and without damaging the pipe.

Disadvantages of electric drain cleaners include high relative cost and weight, and the considerable physical effort that may be required to control the cable.

Safety considerations for electric drain cleaners include the requirement to wear work gloves and eye protection, to carefully control the cable during operation to avoid overstressing it, to use appropriate caution when working around rotating machinery, and to use properly grounded electrical outlets.

Battery powered drain cleaners

Sewer jetters

Sewer jetting is the process of shooting high powered streams of water through the drain, down into the sewer in order to blast away any debris blocking the passage of water. This is more effective than using a snake, blades, or even drain rods because, first the water is shot at such a high intensity that the force isn't even comparable to manual labour, secondly the water is much more capable of bending around curved or angular pipes to reach all the tight spots.

A sewer jetter is composed of a controlled high-pressure water source such as a pressure washer or reciprocating displacement pump, a flexible high-pressure line (called a jetter hose which connects the high-pressure engine to the mini-reel) of up to hundreds of metres (several hundred feet) in length, the Mini-Reel (a hose reel which can be taken a distance from the engine) and a nozzle that uses hydraulic force to pull the line into sewer drains, clean the sides of pipes, and flush out residue. High-pressure sewer jetters can be mounted on trolleys, inside vans or on trailers.

Sewer jetter nozzles come in different sizes and applications; a bullet-type nozzle with a streamlined profile can clear a hole for the larger root cutting nozzle. Root-cutter nozzles are designed to cut roots with a spinning nozzle that shoots a jet stream horizontally inside the pipe. High pressure sewer jetters with root-cutting nozzles can clear a hole through the center of a root-infested sewer line and with its rear-facing jet streams cut the roots and clean the pipe walls, flushing the root debris through the sewer line. The sewer jetter has been labeled as a technological advancement of the plumber's snake (also known as an electric eel) drain clearing method.

Portable sewer jetters and pressure washer sewer jetter attachments are primarily used by service personnel and homeowners to remove soft obstructions throughout the length of a building's sewer drain and to prevent the recurrence of clogs by cleaning the sides of drain pipes and flushing out residue. Pressure washer sewer jetter attachments are generally lower in cost and weight than electric drain cleaners with an equivalent reach, and can present a lower risk of scratching plumbing fixtures.

Truck and trailer-mounted sewer jetters used by municipalities and larger service companies benefit from the high hydraulic horsepower delivered by powerful displacement pumps and so can remove tree roots and other solid obstructions.

Advantages of sewer jetters include the relative ease of penetrating long sewer lines and the ability to remove residue that accumulates along the sides of sewer pipes, thereby reducing the need for subsequent drain cleaning.

Disadvantages of pressure washer sewer jetter attachments and many portable jetters include an inability to extract tree roots and other hard obstructions.  Disadvantages of truck- and trailer-mounted sewer jetters include high relative cost and weight, and the requirement for extensive training to comply with manufacturers' safety guidelines.

Safety considerations for sewer jetters include a requirement to wear protective gloves and eye protection, to avoid contact with sewer drain fluids, and to ensure that the jetter nozzle operates only inside the sewer pipe. Furthermore, larger truck- and trailer-mounted units that operate with sufficient power to cut tree roots require extensive training and strict adherence to manufacturers' safety guidelines to avoid serious injury.

References

Plumbing